Jorge Camarotti is a Brazilian-Canadian film director and screenwriter. He is most noted for his 2019 short film Kinship, which was a Canadian Screen Award nominee for Best Live Action Short Drama at the 8th Canadian Screen Awards in 2020.

Originally from São Paulo, Brazil, Camarotti moved to Montreal, Quebec in 2003 to study film at the Université de Montréal. He released his first short film, 165 Days, in 2014, and appeared in Charlotte Cardin's music video for "Like It Doesn't Hurt" in 2016.

His third short film, Ousmane, premiered at the 2021 Toronto International Film Festival, and received a Canadian Screen Award nomination for Best Live Action Short Drama at the 10th Canadian Screen Awards in 2022.

References

External links

21st-century Canadian screenwriters
21st-century Canadian male writers
Brazilian film directors
Brazilian screenwriters
Brazilian emigrants to Canada
Canadian male screenwriters
Canadian screenwriters in French
Film directors from Quebec
Université de Montréal alumni
Living people
Year of birth missing (living people)
Brazilian people of Italian descent